Leutlwetse Tshireletso (born 25 August 1985) is a Motswana football coach and former player signed to Township Rollers as an assistant coach. He is a former Botswana international, having made seven appearances for the Zebras before his retirement in 2016.

Tshireletso began his playing career with Palapye-based side Motlakase Power Dynamos. After staying with the team for four years he would move to Lobatse with BMC before finally joining Township Rollers. Although he won the Botswana Premier League in his first season with the team, Tshireletso suffered from frequent injuries and was mostly used as a bench player. Following a knee injury which forced him into injury in 2016, Rollers appointed him as one of the three assistant managers alongside Thabo Motang and Mogomotsi Mpote. He remains in that post to this day and occasionally takes charge of the first team in the absence of the manager.

Honours

Club
 Township Rollers
2013–14

References

1985 births
Living people
People from Francistown
Township Rollers F.C. players
Motlakase Power Dynamos players
Gilport Lions F.C. players
Botswana footballers
Botswana international footballers
Botswana football managers
Association football central defenders